Branton is a surname. Notable people with the surname include:

Gene Branton (born 1960), American football player
Jonathan Branton, English lawyer
Leo Branton Jr. (1922–2013), American lawyer
Matthew Branton (born 1968), British novelist and author
Ron Branton (born 1933), Australian rules footballer